Narberdia is a genus of true weevils in the beetle family Curculionidae. There are at least four described species in Narberdia.

Species
These four species belong to the genus Narberdia:
 Narberdia aridulus Burke, 1976 i c b
 Narberdia cervantae Soto-Hernandez g
 Narberdia dugesi Soto-Hernandez g
 Narberdia sarukhani Soto-Hernandez g
Data sources: i = ITIS, c = Catalogue of Life, g = GBIF, b = Bugguide.net

References

Further reading

External links

 

Curculioninae
Articles created by Qbugbot